Madura cattle or Madurese cattle are a stable, inbred hybrid of Zebu and Banteng (Bos javanicus). They originated from the island of Madura just northeast of Java, in Indonesia where the original cattle population was the wild Banteng, very similar to Balinese cattle. Sinhala cattle, a Zebu breed from Sri Lanka, were introduced more than 1500 years ago, and the crossbreeds between the two was found to be better in body size than either of the original breeds. Some sources say the Zebu component was Ongole Cattle from India. The coloration is reddish brown with non-specific white patterning on the back and rump. They are a small breed, bulls having a mature weight of 250 to 300 kg, it is used for racing by the locals and are sometimes called the dancing cattle. In 2002 the population was estimated by the FAO at 900,000. Efforts are being made to conserve the breed on Sapudi island.

Madurese bull racing 

In bull racing two bulls are yoked together, pulling a small sled on which the driver attempts to balance over a hundred-metre course.

References

Beef cattle breeds
Cattle breeds originating in Indonesia
Cattle crossbreeds